The South Atlantic Conference men's basketball tournament is the annual conference basketball championship tournament for the South Atlantic Conference. The tournament has been held annually since 1992. It is a single-elimination tournament and seeding is based on regular season records.

The winner, declared conference champion, receives the conference's automatic bid to the NCAA Men's Division II Basketball Championship.

Results

Championship records

 Coker,  Emory & Henry, and Limestone have not yet reached the finals of the SAC tournament.
 Schools highlighted in pink are former SAC members.

See also
 South Atlantic Conference women's basketball tournament

References

NCAA Division II men's basketball conference tournaments
Tournament
Recurring sporting events established in 1992